Fendlerella is a monotypic genus of shrubs in the Hydrangeaceae containing the single species Fendlerella utahensis. This plant is known as Utah fendlerella, yerba desierto, or sometimes as Utah fendlerbush (it having previously been included in the closely related genus Fendlera, the fendlerbushes).

The species was named for Augustus Fendler in 1898.

References

External links

 Jepson Manual Treatment
 USDA Plants Profile

Hydrangeaceae
Cornales genera
Monotypic asterid genera
Flora of Northwestern Mexico
Flora of the Southwestern United States
Taxa named by Amos Arthur Heller
Flora without expected TNC conservation status